Ælfnoth or Alnoth (died 700) was an English hermit and martyr. Little is known of his life, though he is  mentioned in Jocelyn's life of Saint Werburgh as a pious neatherd at Weedon, who bore with great patience the ill-treatment of the bailiff placed over him, and who afterwards became a hermit in a very lonely spot, where he was eventually murdered by two robbers. On this ground he was honoured as a martyr; and there was some concourse of pilgrims to his tomb at Stowe near Bugbrooke in Northamptonshire. Ælfnoth is not mentioned in any surviving early calendars; his feast was later kept on 27 February or on 25 November.

References
Acta Sanctorum, 27 February, III
Stanton, Richard, Menology (London, 1892), 565
Baring-Gould, Rev S., Lives of Saints (London, 1894), II, 48.

Attribution

7th-century births
700 deaths
Mercian saints
People from West Northamptonshire District
7th-century Christian saints